Nerves of Steel is the second single by Erasure from the album The Neon released on August 13, 2020, which premiered on BBC Radio 2.

Background 
The vocals were done in Atlanta, GA and final mixing done in London.

Andy Bell said:“This is my favorite track from the album, I am truly honored that all our LGBTQIA+ friends were so creative during lockdown and helped us with this joyful video. Thanks for creating such a lovely piece of art!”

Video 
The video features drag queens and LGBTQ+ stars including participants from RuPaul's Drag Race, including Detox, Manila Luzon, Amanda Lepore, Candis Cayne, and a few others. The video was direct by Brad Hammer, and  produced and edited by Tyler Stone.

Reception 
The track has gotten positive reviews.

Retropop Magazine described it: "A synth-driven love song at its core, the track sees Andy Bell pine after a potential lover, over Vince Clark’s trademark pulsing beats."

Stereogum described it: "a patiently pulsing, simmering depiction of that sort of dizzying early love phase."

Slug Magazine said: "Having the distinction of being the most traditional, Erasure-sounding cut, it has all the elements of single status: upbeat but slightly darker synths, intriguing lyrics and a great vocal performance by Bell."

Credits 
Nerves of Steel is written by Vince Clarke and Andy Bell.

Remixes 

 Nerves of Steel (7th Heaven Remix Edit)
 Nerves of Steel (Extended Version) -Vince Clarke mix-
 Nerves of Steel (Bright Light Bright Light Remix)
 Nerves of Steel (7th Heaven Remix)

References 

2020 songs
Songs written by Vince Clarke
Songs written by Andy Bell (musician)
Erasure songs